Morten Sigval Bergesen (born 2 June 1951) is a Norwegian ship-owner.

He was born in Stockholm as a grandson of Sigval Bergesen the Younger. He was also a great-grandson of Sigval Bergesen, grandnephew of Ole Bergesen and cousin of Petter C. G. Sundt. He was a co-owner of his grandfather's shipping company Bergesen d.y. from 1976 together with Petter C. G. Sundt. He sold his share in 2003.

References

1951 births
Living people
Norwegian businesspeople in shipping